Hillyer may refer to:

People
Ethel Hillyer Harris (1859-1931), American author
Barbara Hillyer (born 1934), American women's studies academic
Charles Hillyer Brand (1861–1933), American politician, businessman, jurist and lawyer
Charles T. Hillyer, 19th century politician and soldier from Connecticut
Conway Hillyer Arnold (1848–1917), rear admiral of the United States Navy
Edgar Winters Hillyer (1830–1882), United States federal judge
Enrico Hillyer Giglioli (1845–1909), Italian zoologist and anthropologist
George Hillyer (1835–1927), American politician
Jim Hillyer (coach) (1928–1991), American college football coach
Jim Hillyer (politician) (1974–2016), Canadian politician
Junius Hillyer (1807–1886), American politician and lawyer
Lambert Hillyer (1889–1969), American film director and screenwriter
Lewis Wellington Hillyer (1818–1897), American politician from Iowa
Lonnie Hillyer (1940–1985), American jazz trumpeter
Quin Hillyer (born 1964), American newspaper columnist and writer
Raphael Hillyer (1914–2010), American viola soloist, teacher
Robert Hillyer (1895–1961), American poet
William Hillyer (1813–1861), English cricketer

Other uses
Hillyer College, University of Hartford, West Hartford, Connecticut, USA

See also

 Senator Hillyer (disambiguation)
 
 Hillier (disambiguation), including d'Hillier
 Hill (disambiguation)
 Hiller (disambiguation)
 Hilly (disambiguation)